The 1940 NCAA Swimming and Diving Championships were contested March 29, 1940 at the Payne Whitney Gymnasium at Yale University in New Haven, Connecticut at the fourth annual NCAA-sanctioned swim meet to determine the team and individual national champions of men's collegiate swimming and diving in the United States. 

For the fourth consecutive year, Michigan topped the team standings, edging out hosts Yale by three points. It was the Wolverines' fourth title in program history and the fourth for coach Matt Mann.

Team standings
Note: Top 10 only
(H) = Hosts

See also
List of college swimming and diving teams

References

NCAA Division I Men's Swimming and Diving Championships
NCAA Swimming And Diving Championships
NCAA Swimming And Diving Championships
NCAA Swimming And Diving Championships